The 1999–2000 Hong Kong First Division League season was the 89th since its establishment. The season began on the 7 September 1999 and ended on 20 May 2000.

Teams
 Happy Valley (Defending Champion)
 Instant-Dict
 Kitchee (Promoted from Second Division)
 O&YH Union (Branded O&YH Union due to sponsorship)
 Rangers (Retained in the First Division despite relegated by rules)
 Sai Kung (Renamed from Sai Kung Friends, retained in the First Division despite originally relegated by rules)
 South China
 Sun Hei (Renamed from Golden)

First stage

Second stage

NB: Teams take points and goals halved from first phase. GF and GA is rounded.

Championship playoff

Relegation playoff

Final

References
 www.rsssf.com Hongkong 1999/00

1999-00
Hong
1999–2000 in Hong Kong football